"Crazy Crazy Nights" is a song by American rock band Kiss. It was originally released on the outfit's 1987 album Crazy Nights. Although it peaked at only number 65 on the US Billboard Hot 100, the song became the band's highest-charting single in the United Kingdom (alongside "God Gave Rock 'n' Roll to You II"), peaking at number four on the UK Singles Chart. In August 2019 it received a Silver certification from the British Phonographic Industry for sales and streams exceeding 200,000. The song also reached the top 10 in Ireland and Norway.

Chart performance
The single peaked at number 65 on the Billboard Hot 100 in the United States on 31 October 1987, and at number 37 on Billboard's Album Rock Tracks chart. "Crazy Crazy Nights" was more commercially successful in the United Kingdom, as it peaked at number four, proving to be Kiss' first top-ten single in the UK. The song also reached number seven in Norway, number nine in Ireland, number 28 in the Netherlands and number 31 in Belgium.

Music video
A music video was directed by Jean Pellerin and Doug Freel. It was filmed on August 8, 1987 at the Olympic Auditorium in Los Angeles, CA. The video shows the band performing on a giant stage in front of a crowd.

The Kiss fans that were present that day got free tickets through the radio station KNAC. During the filming, the fans would party between takes to maintain the energy of the setting and event. The band also gave the audience a mini concert wherein they played some of their singles like "Cold Gin", "Lick It Up", "Detroit Rock City", and "Whole Lotta Love".

It was featured in the "Crazy Nights" home video.

Personnel
Paul Stanley – lead vocals, rhythm guitar
Gene Simmons – bass guitar, backing vocals
Eric Carr – drums, percussion, backing vocals
Bruce Kulick – lead guitar, backing vocals

Charts

Weekly charts

Year-end charts

Certifications

In popular culture
Darts players Wes Newton and Jeff Smith use the song as their walk-on song.

References

1987 singles
1987 songs
Kiss (band) songs
Mercury Records singles
Song recordings produced by Ron Nevison
Songs written by Adam Mitchell (songwriter)
Songs written by Paul Stanley